CDR1 antisense RNA is an circular RNA that in humans is encoded by the CDR1-AS gene.

References

Further reading